The mountain starling (Aplonis santovestris), also known as Vanuatu starling, Santo mountain starling or Santo starling, is a bird species in the family Sturnidae. It is endemic to the island of Espiritu Santo in Vanuatu. It is restricted to cloud forest on that island. The species was seldom seen in the 20th century and was at one point feared extinct, although a 1991 expedition managed to find a population high in the mountains.

References

External links
Vanuatu stamp with Santo mountain starling

mountain starling
Birds of Vanuatu
Endemic fauna of Vanuatu
Espiritu Santo
mountain starling
Taxonomy articles created by Polbot